The Beetham Organisation is a privately owned property development and investment company based in Liverpool, UK. It was founded by Hugh Frost as Oastdren Investments in 1985.  Its primary focus is city-centre real estate, specialising in hotel, residential and office projects. , Hugh Frost owned 67%, his sons Stephen Beetham (born Stephen Frost) owned 27% and Simon Frost held the remaining 6% of the company. Stephen changed his name from Frost to Beetham after the sect into which he had been born, the Plymouth Brethren. Beetham is an ancestral family name; the name of the business was changed soon afterwards.

Portfolio
Their portfolio includes;
 Beetham Tower, Liverpool
 10 Holloway Circus also known as Beetham Tower, Birmingham
 Beetham Tower, Manchester, also known as the Hilton Tower
 West Tower also known as Beetham Tower West, Liverpool
 Beetham Tower, Brighton
 One Blackfriars, London, known locally as the Vase.

References

External links
 The Beetham Organisation Website (requires flash-player)
 Beetham Towers Skyscrapernews.com files on all the Beetham projects

Companies based in Liverpool
Investment companies of the United Kingdom
Privately held companies of the United Kingdom